Beryl Satter (born 14 January 1959) is an American historian and a professor of history at Rutgers University.

Life 

Satter was born on 14 January 1959 as the daughter of civil rights lawyer Mark J. Satter, who fought for black families suffering under the ruthless and oftentimes racist conditions that pervaded Chicago's real estate market. In 1965, her father died of heart failure when she was just six years old.

Career 

Satter graduated from Yale University in 1992. She is currently a professor of history at Rutgers University.

The books she has authored focus mostly on the history of the city of Chicago. In particular, they have examined the history of race relations in Chicago, including their connection with the local real estate market, which at times was among the most segregated in the nation. Her work served as the basis for Ta-Nehisi Coates's award-winning 2014 article "The Case for Reparations".

Distinctions 

Satter became a Guggenheim Fellow in 2015.

Bibliography 

Some of her books are:

 Family Properties: Race, Real Estate, and the Exploitation of Black Urban America  
 Each Mind a Kingdom: American Women, Sexual Purity, and the New Thought Movement, 1875-1920

Awards 

 2009: National Jewish Book Award in the History category for Family Properties: Race, Real Estate, and the Exploitation of Black Urban America

References

External links
 

1959 births
Living people
Jewish writers
Jewish historians
21st-century American historians
Yale University alumni
Rutgers University faculty